Joshua William Morris (born 27 October 1982) is an Australian politician. He was a Liberal member of the Victorian Legislative Council, having represented Western Victoria Region from 2014 to 2018.

Morris was born in Ballarat, and studied at St Patrick's College, Ballarat, and the Australian Catholic University. A physical education teacher by profession, he was most recently teaching at Darley Primary School. He was elected to the Ballarat City Council in 2012, and served as mayor from 2013 to 2014, taking a leave of absence from his teaching job.

Morris was a late entry into the 2014 state election, only being preselected for the safe second position on the Liberal ticket for the Western Victoria Region of the Legislative Council in August 2014. Although his seat would be usually considered safe for the Liberal Party, he was defeated amidst the Liberal Party's landslide loss at the 2018 Victorian state election.

References

External links
 Parliamentary voting record of Josh Morris at Victorian Parliament Tracker

1982 births
Living people
Liberal Party of Australia members of the Parliament of Victoria
Members of the Victorian Legislative Council
21st-century Australian politicians